John Daniel Sumner (November 19, 1924 – November 16, 1998) was an American gospel singer, songwriter, and music promoter noted for his bass voice, and his innovation in the Christian and Gospel music fields. Sumner sang in five quartets and was a member of the Blackwood Brothers during their 1950s heyday. Aside from his incredibly low bass voice, Sumner's business acumen helped promote Southern Gospel and move it into the mainstream of American culture and music during the 1950s and 1960s.

Career

Sunny South Quartet and Dixie Lily Harmoneers 
J. D. Sumner first sang with The Sunny South Quartet from 1945 to 1949. The quartet was headquartered in Tampa, Florida and was sponsored by the Dixie Lily Flour Company. In 1949, Sunny South manager Horace Floyd relocated the quartet to Orlando, but Sumner stayed behind in Tampa where he maintained the sponsorship and started a new group, the Dixie Lily Harmoneers, which he sang with for a few months.

Sunshine Boys 
Later in 1949, J. D. Sumner left the Dixie Lily Harmoneers and moved up to Atlanta, Georgia, where he joined the Sunshine Boys. They split their time between Atlanta and Wheeling, West Virginia with the occasional trip to Hollywood to sing in Western movies. The lineup of Fred Daniel on tenor, Ed Wallace on lead, Ace Richman on baritone, and J. D. on bass continued on for five years until June 30, 1954.

Blackwood Brothers Quartet 
On June 30, 1954, tragedy struck the Blackwood Brothers Quartet when a disastrous test run in their private plane cost the lives of baritone R. W. Blackwood and bass singer Bill Lyles. 

J. D. Sumner was immediately hired by the Blackwood Brothers to sing with them to replace Lyles. Cecil Blackwood joined at the same time to replace his brother R. W. on baritone. J. D. sang with the Blackwood Brothers Quartet from 1954 until 1965. While he was with the Blackwoods, Sumner brought the idea of traveling cross country in a tour bus rather than flying, and was the first professional musical group to do so in any genre. He also established the National Quartet Convention along with James Blackwood to showcase the various quartets in the industry and the convention became an annual festival and mainstay in the industry that continues to this day. It was also during this time he met Elvis Presley. Presley lived in Memphis, Tennessee as a young boy and would attend the all night sings at The Ellis Auditorium. Presley was an avid fan of Southern Gospel music and groups such as The Blackwood Brothers and The Statesmen Quartet. Sumner recalled that Presley had missed a concert one month, and Sumner inquired why he did not attend. Presley replied he had no money to get into the show, and Sumner said "Son you come find me when you want to get in, money or not."  Sumner then told his group mates to let Presley in the back stage door so he could attend. Years later, Presley would try out for The Songfellows Quartet, a group associated with The Blackwood Brothers, though did not receive an invitation to join. Shortly thereafter, Presley recorded a demo at Sun Records in Memphis which launched his legendary rock and roll career.

The Stamps Quartet 
In 1962, J. D. Sumner became the manager of the Stamps Quartet, and three years later, he left the Blackwood Brothers to sing with them. Sumner was most noted as the leader of the Stamps Quartet, which became known as J. D. Sumner & The Stamps. As a teenager, Elvis Presley idolized Sumner's singing after seeing him perform with the Sunshine Boys. Presley hired Sumner & The Stamps as his back-up singers in 1971. The group toured and recorded with Presley from November 1971 until Presley's death in 1977. Sumner not only sang at Elvis' funeral but had previously sung at the funeral of Elvis' mother Gladys in 1958. J. D. and The Stamps opened for Jerry Lee Lewis in 1980 in the United Kingdom, the Stamps only overseas performance.

Masters V 
After the Stamps Quartet disbanded in 1980, Sumner with Hovie Lister, Jake Hess, Rosie Rozell, and James Blackwood formed the Masters V as a special consolidation of members of the Blackwood Brothers Quartet and Statesmen Quartet. The group was a showcase for Sumner's voice and compositions and won the 1981 Grammy Award for best traditional gospel performance. Sumner was credited not only for his singing, songwriting, and concert promotions, but was also noted for being the first to customize a coach bus for the entertainment business to use for music groups.

Later career with Stamps 
After the Masters V disbanded in 1988, Sumner reformed the Stamps Quartet and performed with the group until his death in 1998. He was often seen in his latter years appearing as a guest artist on the Bill Gaither Homecoming videos. After Sumner's death, lead singer Ed Enoch, a member of the Stamps since 1969, took over the group and renamed it "Ed Enoch and the Golden Covenant."

Relationship with Elvis Presley 
Sumner met a young Elvis Presley when he was singing with the Blackwood Brothers. Presley was 19 and had shown up at a concert but did not have the money to get in; Sumner found out about it and told Presley anytime he wanted to come in to find him and he would admit him at any place they were singing. The two formed a strong relationship.

In a 1990 interview with Geraldo Rivera, Sumner contradicted many myths regarding Presley's substance abuse, namely that Presley was a heavy drinker and used illicit substances. "I knew Elvis from the time he was 14, and all I ever saw him drink was one glass of peach brandy. He (Presley) would fire you for using marijuana, he detested cocaine, and barely approved of me drinking." Sumner also stated that Elvis "had no idea that he was killing himself with his medications, he felt as long as he was doing what the Doctor was OK with, he was staying within the bounds." Presley's death hit Sumner hard and The Stamps sang at Presley's funeral and Sumner credits Presley with saving his own life by intervening with his own alcohol use. "He (Elvis) helped saved my marriage, my health, my career, and ultimately, my life."

Range and awards 
For 18 years, Sumner held the Guinness World Record for recording the lowest bass note. As of 2011, he has been surpassed only by the following three vocalists: Dan Britton (1984), Tim Storms (2002 and once more in 2012), and Roger Menees (2011). Sumner was inducted into the Gospel Music Hall of Fame in 1984 and the Southern Gospel Music Association Hall of Fame in 1997.

Death 
J.D. Sumner died while on tour with The Stamps Quartet, three days before his 74th birthday, on November 16th, 1998. He was found dead of a heart attack in his hotel room in Myrtle Beach, SC.

Other activities 
In 1964, Sumner founded the Gospel Music Association with James Blackwood. He was also the founding force behind the National Quartet Convention.

Songwriting 
Sumner wrote more than 700 songs including the following:

A Land Where Milk And Honey Flows
A Million Years From Now
Aloha Time
Because Of Him
Behind Your Tears
Beyond God's Horizon
Crossing Chilly Jordan
Each Step I Take
Eternal Paradise
Everybody Ought To Love
For I've Got The Lord
Give Me The Strength To Stand
God Made A Way
He Means All The World To Me
He Will See You Through
Heaven For Me
He's All That I Need
His Love
I Believe In The Old Time Way
I Can Feel The Touch Of His Hand
I Do Dear Jesus I Believe
I Don't Mind
I Found God
I Know It's So
I Serve A Living God
I Wanna Rest
I Want To Meet You Up In Heaven
I Wouldn't Trade
I'll Follow Where He Leads
I'm Happy And Free
In That Land
Inside The Gate
I've Got To Walk That Lonesome Road
Jesus Is Mine
Keep Me
Listen
Mammy's Boy
My All I Give
Never
Old Man Death
On That Happy Golden Shore
On The Other Side Of Jordan
One Day
Only One Touch
Paradise Valley
Pay As You Go
Rolling Along
Some Wonderful Day
Someday Soon
Something Old Something New
Sweet Peace
Thank God For Calvary
The Old Country Church
The Touch Of His Hand
The Victory Road
There Is A Light
Walking And Talking With My Lord
Walking In The Light
What A Glorious Morning That Will Be
What A Morning
When I'm Alone
When The Clouds Roll By
Wonderful Love
Wonderful Savior

The Stamps Quartet Members

Line-ups

Golden Covenant Members

Line-ups

The New Stamps Quartet members

Line-ups

Discography

Solo albums 
1965: Bass, Bass, Bass (re-issued in 1975 as The Stamps Quartet Present Their Dynamic Bass)
1968: The Many Moods Of The Illustrious J.D. Sumner
1969: The Heart Of A Man (re-issued in 1982 as The Masters V Present Their Majestic Bass, J.D. Sumner)
1972: The Way It Sounds Down Low
1984: Thank God For Kids
1985: An American Trilogy 
1988: The Masters V Present The Superlative Bass Voice Of J.D. Sumner

Compilations 
1999: The Wait Is Over
2009: A Musical Biography

With The Blackwood Brothers 

1956: Hymn Sing
1957: I'm Bound For That City
1958: His Hands
1959: The Stranger Of Galilee
1959: Paradise Island
1959: The Blackwood Brothers
1959: Give The World A Smile
1960: Beautiful Isle Of Somewhere
1960: Sunday Meetin' Time
1961: The Pearly White City
1962: Precious Memories
1962: The Blackwood Brothers Combine With The Statesmen to Wish You a Musical Merry Christmas
1962: The Keys To The Kingdom
1962: At Home With The Blackwoods
1963: The Blackwood Brothers Quartet Featuring Their Famous Bass J. D. Sumner
1963: Give Us This Day
1964: Blackwood Family Album
1964: Gloryland Jubilee
1965: Something Old – Something New
1965: Do You Thank The Lord Each Day

J.D. Sumner & The Stamps 
1965: The Stamps featuring Jim Hill
1966: The Incomparable Stamps Quartet 
1966: The New, Very New Sound
1967: Colorful
1968: Music, Music, Music
1969: Signs Of A Good Life
1969: Songs To Remember
1970: J.D. Sumner And The Exciting Stamps Quartet
1970: Get Together
1971: Goin' Home (re-issued in 1984 as Green Grass Of Home)
1971: Live In Nashville
1971: The Touch Of His Hand
1972: Sweet Song of Salvation
1972: Something Special
1973: Leaning On The Arms Of Jesus
1973: Sing Gospel Classics
1974: I Will Never Pass This Way Again
1974: What a Happy Time
1975: Live at Murray State
1977: Street Corner Preacher
1977: Elvis' Favorite Gospel Songs (Sung at His Funeral)
1977: Memories Of Our Friend, Elvis (Live)
1979: Keep Me
1980: I Believe In The Old Time Way (re-issued in 1983 as If I Can Help Somebody)
1988: Sing The Award-Winning Songs Of J.D. Sumner
1988: Today
1988: Inspirational Hymns
1988: Smile
1989: Live From The Alabama State Coliseum
1990: Victory Road
1991: Peace in the Valley
1991: Town & Country
1991: Southern Gospel Classics
1991: Light And Lively
1991: "Sing" - Cerely Yours
1992: Quartet Classics
1992: Master of the Wind
1993: 20 Southern Gospel Favorites
1994: Songs You Requested
1994: Elvis Gospel Favorites
1994: Sing Elvis Classics (all secular songs)
1995: Let's Have Church
1996: Golden Stairs
1999: The Final Sessions

Compilations 
1968: Best Of The Stamps
1974: Vintage Gospel  (re-issued in 1983 as Daddy Sang Bass)
1974: Sing Golden Gospel Hits
1977: 16 Greats
1979: For God So Loved The World (re-issued in 1982 as He Looked Beyond My Faults)
1983: The Joy Of Knowing Jesus
1992: Masters of Gospel
1995: The Best Of JD Sumner And The Stamps
1997: Pure Gospel: 16 Vintage Gospel Standards
1999: Gospel Music Hall of Fame
2005: Treasury Of Memories

With The Masters V 
See Masters V discography

References

External links 

Official home page of J.D. Sumner and the Stamps Quartet 
 
Larry Strickland Interview at Elvis2001.net 
Donnie Sumner Interview at Elvis2001.net 
Ed Hill Interview at Elvis2001.net 
Bill Baise Interview at Elvis2001.net 
Ed Enoch Interview at Elvis2001.net 
Shaun Neilson Interview at Elvis2001.net 

1924 births
1998 deaths
American basses
American gospel singers
Musicians from Lakeland, Florida
Singers with a four-octave vocal range
Songwriters from Florida
Southern gospel performers
20th-century American singers
Radio personalities from Tampa, Florida
20th-century American male singers
Elvis Presley